West Forsyth High School is a public high school, located in Cumming, Georgia, United States, a suburb northeast of Atlanta. The school is located at 4155 Drew Road.

West Forsyth High School opened in 2007 with 1,200 students in grades 9 through 11, with a senior class added the following year. West Forsyth High School was the first true high school since Forsyth Central (formally Forsyth County High) was built in 1955. North and South Forsyth High are converted junior high schools. West Forsyth High was built to alleviate overcrowding at South Forsyth and Forsyth Central high schools. West Forsyth High is the first construction of the district's two-story high school prototype. The school motto, "I am West Forsyth, and we are family" is commonly used at the school.

Athletics and clubs
West Forsyth currently competes in the GHSA Region 5-AAAAAAA in all sports, except for lacrosse, in which it competes in Area 3-AAAAAA, and has since 2010.

WFHS has varsity sports teams in competition cheerleading, cross country, football, softball, volleyball, basketball, swimming, wrestling, baseball, golf, lacrosse, track, tennis, soccer and gymnastics.

The school's clubs include the National Honor Society, Fellowship of Christian Athletes, an equestrian club and a dance team.
 
West Forsyth also has a Region 5-AAAAAAA competing theatre troupe.

The school has a renowned AP program offering over 20 courses.

West Forsyth has received multiple honors including AP STEM Achievement School, AP Merit School, and AP Humanities School.

West Forsyth has the second largest DECA chapter in the world, as of the 2015–2016 school year.

West Forsyth also has a Gaming Club and a E-Sports Team.

References

External links
 West Forsyth High School's homepage
 Forsyth County Schools
 ghsa.net/

Public high schools in Georgia (U.S. state)
Schools in Forsyth County, Georgia
Educational institutions established in 2007
2007 establishments in Georgia (U.S. state)